Mighty Motorsports is a defunct NASCAR Craftsman Truck Series team. Used to be owned by racer Rob Ferguson, it fielded the No. 24 PMI Heating and Air Conditioning Chevrolet Silverado driven by Wayne Edwards in the early part of 2006 before its closure. The team was sold to Ferguson by previous owner Lonnie Troxell in 2005. The team's corporate headquarters were located in Poway, California, but the shop was in Mooresville, North Carolina.

The team made its debut in 2000 at Homestead-Miami Speedway. Edwards, who was a co-owner of the team, drove the No. 93 WorldBestBuy.com Chevy to a 27th-place finish. Edwards ran twelve other races that year, his best finish a 19th at Loudon, leading to a 30th-place finish in the owner's points. Edwards made two starts for the team in 2001, both resulting in early engine failures. Other drivers raced for Troxell that year were Mike Harmon, Jerry Hill, and Mike Leffingwell. Hill had the best finish for the team, posting a 17th-place run at Texas. 

After Edwards left, The team continued to use rotating drivers in 2002, as Randy Briggs, Jody Lavender, Michael Dokken, Brad Bennett, and Jerry Allec, Jr. all shared the ride during the season, with Briggs posting the best finish of the season, a 23rd at Kansas. In 2003, Teri MacDonald began running with Troxell in an aborted run at Rookie of the Year, before Dokken, Trevor Boys, Dana White, Dokken, Roland Isaacs, and Jason White shared the ride for the rest of the season. The team finished 26th in points that season.

In 2004, Edwards returned and had a fifteenth-place run at the Florida Dodge Dealers 250, before Ricky Gonzales ran the next two races for the team. The team did not attempt a race until the Kroger 200, when Edwards failed to qualify. Ferguson attempted the race at Martinsville Speedway, but also failed to qualify. After 2004, Troxell sold the team to Ferguson, who renamed the team "Mighty Motorsports", as well as purchasing equipment and owner's points from Bang! Racing. Edwards started off the season with a ninth-place run at Daytona, but was soon replaced by Casey Kingsland and Blake Mallory. After Edwards finished out the season for the team, the team did not qualify for a race in 2006.

Sources 
Troxell - NASCAR Owner
Rob Ferguson Owner Statistics

American auto racing teams
Companies based in San Diego County, California
Defunct NASCAR teams
Defunct companies based in California